The Red Line (Line 1) of the Lucknow Metro is a metro route of mass rapid transit system in Lucknow. It is also known as the North-South corridor of Lucknow. The Lucknow metro train consists of four coaches, and they have a maximum speed of 90 km/h. Most of the lines are elevated.

List of stations
Following is a list of stations on this route

See also

References

External links

 

Lucknow Metro lines
Railway lines opened in 2017
2017 establishments in Uttar Pradesh